Reinier Camminga (chosen approximately 1300 to 1306) was the ninth potestaat or governor of Friesland now a province of the Netherlands.

Reijner Haijes Camminga  was captain when the Danes made an incursion into Oostergo in 1306 because of disputes with the Frisians.

Occo Scarlensis wrote about a drawn-out battle after which the Danes retreated beyond the Lauwers.  This battle would have been against Eric VI of Denmark.

References
Jan Wagenaar et al.: Vaderlandsche historie: vervattende de geschiedenissen der nu Vereenigde 1797 p122 

Potestaats of Friesland